The IPSC Nordic Shotgun Championship is an IPSC level 3 championship hosted in every year either in Norway, Sweden, Finland or Denmark.

Champions 
The following is a list of current and past IPSC Nordic Shotgun champions.

Overall category

Lady category

Senior category

Team category

References

IPSC :: Match Results - 2013 Nordic Shotgun Championship, Finland
IPSC :: Match Results - 2016 Nordic Shotgun Championship, Finland

IPSC shooting competitions
Shooting sports in Europe by country
Sport in Scandinavia
Inter-Nordic sports competitions